The 1968 Missouri Tigers football team was an American football team that represented the University of Missouri in the Big Eight Conference (Big 8) during the 1968 NCAA University Division football season. The team compiled an 8–3 record (5–2 against Big 8 opponents), finished in third place in the Big 8, defeated Alabama in the 1968 Gator Bowl, and outscored opponents by a combined total of 308 to 136. Dan Devine was the head coach for the 11th of 13 seasons. The team played its home games at Memorial Stadium in Columbia, Missouri.

The team's statistical leaders included Greg Cook with 693 rushing yards, Terry McMillan with 745 passing yards and 1,102 yards of total offense, Jon Staggers with 171 receiving yards, and James Harrison with 48 points scored.

Schedule

Roster

Game summaries

Gator Bowl

References

Missouri
Gator Bowl champion seasons
Missouri Tigers football seasons
Missouri Tigers football